Jannaschia seohaensis is a Gram-negative and motile bacterium from the genus of Jannaschia which has been isolated from tidal flat sediments from the Yellow Sea in Korea.

References

Rhodobacteraceae
Bacteria described in 2010